Gollum is a genus of ground sharks in the family Pseudotriakidae, native to the southwestern Pacific Ocean. The genus was described in 1973 by biologist Leonard Compagno, who named it named after the character Gollum from J. R. R. Tolkien's works, noting the species Gollum attenuatus (the slender smooth-hound) "bears some resemblance in form and habits".

Species
The currently described species and one undescribed species in this genus are:
 G. attenuatus (Garrick, 1954) (slender smooth-hound)
 G. suluensis Last & Gaudiano, 2011 (Sulu gollumshark)
 Gollum sp. B not yet described (white-marked gollumshark)

See also 

 Aenigmachanna gollum, a species of fish named after the same character from Tolkien's works.

References

Gollum (genus)
Shark genera
Taxa named by Leonard Compagno
Organisms named after Tolkien and his works